An operational context (OLC) for an operation is the external environment that influences its operation. For a mobile application, the OLC is defined by the combined hardware/firmware/software configurations of several appliances or devices, as well as the bearer of the mobiles of these units and other work position environment this person as the key stakeholder makes use of in timely, spatial and modal coincidence.

This concept differs from the operating context and does not address the operating system of computers.

Example 

The classic example is defined by the electronic leash configuration, where one mobile appliance is wirelessly tethered to another such appliance. The function of this electronic leash is to set an aural alarm with any of these two in case of unintentional leaving one of these two behind.

Implementing the example 

Several suppliers offer the electronic leash solution. A new aspect has been launched with Bluetooth low energy for better economised battery life cycle. Special trimming serves for two years operation from a button cell.

References

See also
 Context
 Operating context, the external environment that influences an operation;
 Unilateration

Wireless networking